Glenrothes Hospital is a health facility in Lodge Rise, Glenrothes, Scotland. It is managed by NHS Fife.

History 
The facility was built in the early 1980s and officially opened in October 1981. It provides around 60 beds for inpatients and 20 beds within its day hospital facilities. In spring 2018 the hospital was unable to provide out-of-hours services because of staff shortages; this was still an issue in 2019.

References 

Hospitals in Fife
NHS Scotland hospitals
1981 establishments in Scotland
Hospitals established in 1981
Hospital buildings completed in 1981